Proschoenobius subcervinellus is a moth in the family Crambidae. It was described by Francis Walker in 1863. It is found in Honduras.

References

Moths described in 1863
Schoenobiinae